Grange Academy or The Grange Academy may refer to:

The Grange Academy, Bushey, a secondary school located in Hertfordshire, England
Grange Academy, Kempston, a special school located in Bedfordshire, England
Grange Academy, Kilmarnock, a secondary school located in Ayrshire, Scotland
The Grange Academy, Runcorn, a secondary school located in Cheshire, England

See also
Grange School (disambiguation)